{{DISPLAYTITLE:Appletons travel guides}}Appletons'''' travel guide books were published by D. Appleton & Company of New York. The firm's series of guides to railway travel in the United States began in the 1840s. Soon after it issued additional series of handbooks for tourists in the United States, Europe, Canada and Latin America.

List of Appletons' guides by geographic coverage

Canada
 
 
 

Europe
 
 
 
  
 1886 ed.: p.1-421 + Index
 . p.399-815
 1881 ed.: p.425-950 
 1888 ed.: p.423-916; index

Latin America
  
 1893 ed. + Index
 
 
 
  + Index

United States
 
 
 . 
 1865 ed.
 . Index
 
 1893 ed. + Index
 
  Index
 
 1894 ed. + Index

North & East USA
 
 
 1853 ed.; 1872 ed.
 
 
 
 1903 ed.
 1904 ed.
 

South & West USA
 
  + Index
 . Index
 
 
 
  + Index

See also
 Picturesque America''

Notes

References

External links
 

Travel guide books
Series of books
Publications established in 1848
D. Appleton & Company books
American travel books